Seaham is a seaside town in County Durham, England. The town grew from the late 19th century onwards as a result of investments in its harbour and coal mines. The town is twinned with the German town of Gerlingen.

History 

The original village of Seaham has all but vanished; it lay between St Mary's Church and Seaham Hall (i.e. somewhat to the north of the current town centre). The parish church, St Mary the Virgin, has a late 7th century. The Anglian nave resembling the church at Escomb in many respects, and is one of the 20 oldest surviving churches in the UK.

Until the early years of the 19th century, Seaham was a small rural agricultural farming community whose only claim to fame was that the local landowner's daughter, Anne Isabella Milbanke, was married at Seaham Hall to Lord Byron, on 2 January 1815.
Byron began writing his Hebrew Melodies at Seaham and they were published in April 1815.
It would seem that Byron was bored in wintry Seaham, though the sea enthralled him.
As he wrote in a letter to a friend:

The marriage was short-lived, producing as its only child the mathematician Ada Lovelace, but it was long enough to have been a drain on the Milbanke estate. The area's fortunes changed when the Milbankes sold out in 1821 to the 3rd Marquess of Londonderry, who built a harbour, in 1828, to facilitate transport of goods from locally encouraged industries (the first coal mine was begun in 1845). However, this harbour later proved inadequate to deal with the millions of tonnes of coal and the 6th Marquess commissioned engineers Patrick Meik and Charles Meik to reclaim land and extend and deepen the dock. It was officially opened in 1905. The harbour is of particular interest because it consists of a series of interconnecting locks, rather than the more typical two wall construction.

As early as 1823, the 3rd Marquess had approached the architect John Dobson with a view to his drawing up plans for a town to be built around the harbour. Dobson did so, but the planned approach foundered for lack of funds, and the town instead grew in a more piecemeal fashion. To begin with, the town was itself called Seaham Harbour (to differentiate it from the ancient village); in time, though, the settlement as a whole came to be known as Seaham.

In 1853 John Candlish built the Londonderry Bottleworks in the town. It was the largest glass bottle works in Britain and survived until 1921. Candlish went on to become mayor and, in 1868, Liberal MP for Sunderland. Waste glass from the bottleworks was dumped at sea and is now washed up as glass pebbles, known as sea glass, on local beaches.

In 1928, production started at the last town colliery to be opened, Vane Tempest. By 1992, however, all three pits (Dawdon Colliery, Vane Tempest Colliery and Seaham Colliery – known locally as "the Knack") had closed, a process accelerated by the British miners' strike. The pit closures hit the local economy extremely hard.

Seaham Colliery suffered an underground explosion in 1880 which resulted in the loss of over 160 lives, including surface workers and rescuers.

Many local families were affected by the tragic loss of eight men and one boy in the 'Seaham Lifeboat Disaster', when the RNLI lifeboat, the George Elmy, foundered on 17 November 1962. To commemorate the event, the new coast road was named George Elmy Lifeboat Way.

Governance and politics 

An electoral ward with the same name exists. The population of this ward taken at the 2011 census was 8419.

Seaham is part of the Easington parliament constituency and is currently represented in the House of Commons of the Parliament of the United Kingdom by Labour Member of Parliament, Grahame Morris, who has served since the 2010 general election.

Today 

Seaham has fine beaches and transport links to the eastern coast. From 2001 most of the Durham coastline was designated as a "heritage coast" and Seaham beach was entirely restored.
In 2002 the Turning the Tide project won, jointly with the Eden Project, the prize for Outstanding Achievement in Regeneration in the annual Royal Institution of Chartered Surveyors awards. Seaham Hall is now a luxury hotel and spa.

The "Byron Place" shopping centre (named from Seaham's association with Lord Byron) opened in 2007 and includes Asda and Wilko stores.

In 2006, a survey conducted by Halifax revealed that Seaham was, at the time, the top property price increase hotspot in England and Wales as average prices had risen by 172% since 2003 although the average price remained well below the national average. It is believed this surge had been greatly helped by regeneration work in the area, and in particular the new housing estate East Shore Village.

Today, the town has a population of around 22,000, and is served by Seaham railway station, which lies on the Durham Coast Line, running from Middlesbrough to Newcastle, via Hartlepool, Stockton and Sunderland. Local bus services operated by Arriva North East and Go North East also provide access to the nearby towns of Murton, Peterlee and Houghton-le-Spring, as well as further afield to Sunderland, Newcastle upon Tyne, Durham, Darlington, Stockton-on-Tees and Middlesbrough.

Seaham has one secondary school, without a sixth-form, called Seaham High School, before 2016 known as Seaham School of Technology.

In October 2021 hundreds of dead crabs were washed-up on the beach at Seaton Carew. Similar mass die-offs of shellfish occurred along other stretches of the northeast coast.

Sport 
Seaham's main football team is Seaham Red Star F.C., formerly Seaham Colliery Welfare Red Star, located near Seaham's Red Star park. The club plays in Northern League Division One.

Seaham has two cricket clubs, Seaham Harbour Cricket club, and Seaham Park Cricket Club. Both senior teams play in the Durham & Northeast Cricket League.

In the 2019-20 rugby season, Seaham RUFC were promoted from Durham/Northumberland 3 into Durham/Northumberland 2.

Media coverage 

The final scene of the 1971 film, Get Carter, was shot at Blackhall Rocks beach, Seaham.

The rich mining history of the town was highlighted in the 2000 film Billy Elliot, which was set during the 1984–85 UK miners' strike in the fictional County Durham town of Everington but which displayed characteristics particular to East Durham pit communities such as Seaham and Easington Colliery.
Both towns feature as locations in the film, notably Dawdon Miners' Club, into which Elliot's dad runs when he learns his son has won an audition at dance school.
Elliot's "angry dance" scene takes place in Dawdon between Embleton Street and Stavordale Street West.

The opening scene in Alien 3 (1992) was filmed on Blast Beach, at Dawdon.
The town has also served as a location for the BAFTA nominated film Life For Ruth (1962) starring Janet Munro and Patrick McGoohan.

The town appeared in the BBC Three sitcom Live!Girls! present Dogtown which premiered on the channel in autumn 2006. According to the Sunderland Echo (11 February 1999), scenes from Saving Private Ryan (1998) were also going to be filmed in Seaham, but government intervention moved production elsewhere.

According to Tom McNee's 1992 portrait of the town The Changing Face of Seaham: 1928–1992, St. John's parish church was used as the setting of a 1985 service recorded for BBC Radio 3. Also, a two-part Channel 4 documentary profiled the town in 1991.

Landmarks 

To the south, beside the road to Dalton-le-Dale, are the remains of Dalden Tower, comprising the ruins of a 16th-century tower and fragments of later buildings.

The harbour itself may be said to be the principal landmark of the nineteenth-century town; though the Londonderry Institute in Tempest Road (1853-5 by Thomas Oliver) with its monumental Greek-style portico provides something of a glimpse of the Marquess's original vision for the town.
Of a slightly later date, the former Londonderry Offices on the sea front once served as headquarters for the mining and other businesses of the Londonderry family.
A statue of the 6th Marquess stands in the forecourt.
Also dating from an early stage in the town's development is the town-centre church of St John, Seaham Harbour (1835–40).
For the very much older St Mary's, Seaham, and its neighbour Seaham Hall, see above.

For just over a hundred years the harbour was towered over by a  lighthouse on Red Acre Point, immediately to the north, designed by William Chapman. The lighthouse was gas-lit, with an arrangement of third-order catadioptric lenses provided by Chance Brothers & Co. It was decommissioned in 1905, when the harbour was expanded and the current black-and-white striped pier-head light was constructed. Red Acre lighthouse was left standing, however, to serve as a daymark, until 1940 when the whole structure was swiftly demolished in case it should serve to assist enemy navigators.

A steel statue, 1101 (locally also known as Tommy) by local artist Ray Lonsdale, commemorating World War One and initially erected temporarily for three months, was the subject of a local fund-raising drive in 2014 to retain it on the town's seafront.

Notable people

Between 1929 and 1935, the Member of Parliament (MP) for Seaham (the defunct constituency which covered the area now renamed Easington) was Labour Prime Minister Ramsay MacDonald.
Easington constituency has only ever returned Labour candidates to Parliament,
and at the 2010 General Election, Labour candidate Grahame Morris was elected with a majority of 14,982 votes.

Seaham has also produced several able footballers, some of whom have gone on to play for the local team, Sunderland, such as Richie Pitt and Gary Rowell. Terry Fenwick and Brian Marwood played for England, with the latter, on retirement from football, working as a commentator for Sky Sports. 
Paul Gascoigne also lived in Seaham in the late 1990s, while playing for Middlesbrough.

Other notable residents include:
 Baritone Sir Thomas Allen was born in Seaham in 1944
 Martin Brammer, musician
 Bob Fox, musician
 Elizabeth Sterling Haynes (born in Seaham in 1897), Canadian theatre activist
 Janie Jones, singer
 William McNally, Victoria  Cross winner
 Ian Pattison, cricketer
 Agony aunt and author Denise Robertson lived in the town for many years
 Alex Russell, former professional footballer
 Peter Willey, Northamptonshire and England cricketer, went to Seaham Secondary School

Freedom of the Town
The following people and military units have received the Freedom of the Town of Seaham.

Military Units
 The 4th Regiment Royal Artillery: 23 July 2022.

References

External links 

 Seaham Marina Independent Information Website
 The history of Seaham and surrounding towns and villages, Great picture archive
 BBC Wear – Seaham stories and pictures
 Seaham council
 Seaham history project
 A brief history of Seaham
 Children in the Mines
 Seaham colliery
 Seaham Colliery Disaster
 Flickr Group, Images of Seaham
 History of Seaham Hall
 Seaham Harbour Online
 Seaham Lifeboat Disaster
 Tide times for Seaham from BBC, Easytide, and Tide Times
 The George Elmy Disaster.
http://www.dawdoncollieryremembered.uk/

 
Towns in County Durham
Populated coastal places in County Durham
Civil parishes in County Durham